On 18 June 2017, under Operation Laylat al-Qadr, Iran's Islamic Revolutionary Guard Corps (IRGC) fired six surface-to-surface mid-range ballistic missile from domestic bases targeting ISIL forces in the Syrian Deir ez-Zor Governorate in response to the terrorist attacks in Tehran earlier that month. Next day, the IRGC published aerial videos recorded by the Damascus-based IRGC drones flying over the city during the operation, confirming that the missiles had successfully hit the targets with precision.

In a statement released by IRGC in connection with the strike, they warned terrorists and "their regional and trans-regional supporters" against any new terrorist attacks on Iran. They threatened to respond with greater intensity, should Iran's security be jeopardized by its enemies again.

Background 
During the 2017 Tehran attacks on the Islamic Consultative Assembly (Iran's parliament) and the Mausoleum of Ruhollah Khomeini 18 people died (excluding the attackers). The responsibility was claimed by ISIL. The Iranian Islamic Revolutionary Guard Corps (IRGC) subsequently vowed retaliation for the attacks. Supreme Leader of Iran Seyed Ali Khamenei stated on his website that Iran would "slap its enemies" in connection with the Tehran attacks. Hours before the missile strike, Iranian Army's rapid response forces were deployed in the country's western border areas.

Some Iranian sources suggested that IRGC chose Dayr al-Zawr given that the area had begun to serve as the primary center of assembly, command, and logistics for ISIL militants lately, as they had been moving there after defeats in Aleppo and Mosul over the previous months.

Missile strike 
The missiles were fired on 17 June 2017 from IRGC Aerospace Force bases in the Iranian provinces of Kermanshah and Kurdistan against key ISIL sites in the Deir ez-Zor region in Syria. According to IRGC, the strike targeted ISIL "command centers, gatherings, logistic sites and factories of suicide car bombs". This became Iran's first operational use of mid-range missiles  since the Iran–Iraq War. Iranian television showed footage of the missiles being launched into the night sky.

According to The Guardian, it is the first time that IRGC conducted such a strike from Iranian territory.

The day after the strike, IRGC released footage depicting moments the missiles successfully hit their targets. The videos were transmitted by drones that the IRGC flew from Damascus over Dayr al-Zour. IRGC spokesman Brigadier General Ramezan Sharif claimed: "Fortunately, all incoming reports and images of drones which were monitoring the operation suggest that the six medium-range powerful Iranian missiles have precisely hit the targets, the key bases of terrorists in the general area of Dayr al-Zawr inside Syria." Amir Ali Hajizadeh, commander of the IRGC's Aerospace Force, said the videos showed them that "the missiles precisely hit their targets."

IRGC later provided further details, saying the attack was performed in coordination with the General Staff of the Armed Forces and the Iranian Leader, who is the official commander-in-chief of the Iranian military. The attack was planned by IRGC Aerospace Force based on the intelligence provided by the Quds Force. According to IRGC general Ramazan Sharif, the attack was coordinated in advance with the Syrian government, and the missiles passed through Iraqi airspace to reach their targets.

Official statements 
In a public statement related to the strikes, published by its Public Relations Office, the IRGC cautioned that the missile strikes were just a warning to deter any further action by the terrorists. It specifically read that the "IRGC warns the Takfiri terrorists and their regional and trans-regional supporters that they would be engulfed by its revolutionary wrath and flames of the fire of its revenge in case they repeat any such devilish and dirty move in future."

Iranian state television quoted Gen. Ramazan Sharif as saying that "if they (IS) carry out a specific action to violate our security, there will definitely be more launches, with intensified strength. ... The Saudis and Americans are especially receivers of this message. ... Obviously and clearly, some reactionary countries of the region, especially Saudi Arabia, had announced that they are trying to bring insecurity into Iran." The same missiles can reach Saudi capital Riyadh, if fired from Iran.

On June 19, Bahram Qassemi, Iran's Foreign Ministry's spokesman, stated that the Sunday missile attack against Takfiri targets in Syria was "just a small slap" in the face of the terrorists and their patrons. The retaliation "was just a wake-up warning to those who still cannot or have not managed to decently comprehend the realities of the region and their own limits," he said, adding that "Iran does not take lightly the issue of defending its security and stability."

Ali Akbar Velayati, a senior adviser to the Leader of the Islamic Revolution, also said, "the world's most independent country will authoritatively respond to the ill-wishers, terrorists, and the enemies wherever they might be."

Reaction 
Syrian Information Minister, Mohammad Ramez Tourjman said the IRGC missile strikes showed that Iran confronts threats to its existence at all levels, and they "deterred the US from even thinking of attacking Iran or isolating the country." He added the attacks signaled that Syria and the resistance front in Iran and Iraq are determined to uproot terrorism in all forms with all means in hand.

Israeli Prime Minister Benjamin Netanyahu said "I have one message for Iran: Don't threaten Israel. ... We are watching their actions and watching their words". Israeli Defense Minister Avigdor Liberman reacted to the missile strikes by saying "Israel is not worried. Israel is prepared for every development. And we are prepared, we have no concerns or worries". Israeli Defense Forces Chief of Staff Gadi Eisenkot acknowledged that the missiles “made a statement” to the world about Iran's preparedness to use its ballistic missiles.

Analysis

Tactical 
Israeli Defense Forces Chief of Staff Gadi Eisenkot stated that the missiles "operational achievement was much smaller" than what has been reported and Iran obtained "far from precise hits." Israeli media claimed that three of the seven missiles Iran launched came down in Iraq without even making it to Syria, and only one of the seven landed on its intended target, an Islamic State base in Syria's mostly IS-held Deir Ezzor province. Another of the seven landed hundreds of yards away, in the city of Mayadin.

On June 24, Brigadier General, Amir Ali Hajizadeh, Commander of IRGC Aerospace Force responded to the claims by Israeli sources, reiterating that the missiles had all hit their targets, and what Israelis had witnessed falling into Iraq were the missiles trunks that were detached from the warheads as the missiles reached as close as 100 kilometers to the targets.

In an interview with BBC Persian, Farzin Nadimi, an independent military expert, stated that judging by the videos and satellite images, it looks like two unknown targets were nearly hit. Babak Taghvaie, an Iranian author and defense researcher in the same news agency reported that two missiles landed in the target area, one hit open land 150 meters off the specified target (the headquarters of ISIL regional command, in the building that was previously a school called Al-reshad), and the other hit a building next to its target (a telecommunication building), overall, the attack had little accuracy.

Syrian opposition activist Omar Abu Laila, who is based in Germany but closely follows events in his native Deir el-Zour, said two Iranian missiles fell near and inside Mayadin, an Islamic State stronghold. He said there were no casualties from the strikes.

According to an analysis by French experts, Stéphane Delory and Can Kasapoglu, the released videos show 4 missiles hitting their targets. Assessing the footage released by the IRGC from multiple angles proved that only two locations in Mayadin being hit, suggested four of the missiles failed to reach their targets, besides, Satellite images revealed that the two missiles that reached Mayadin landed in open areas.

Strategic and political 
The Jerusalem Post claimed the strike is a warning aimed at the United States, Saudi Arabia but also Israel.

CNN military analyst, described Iran's move as a "real escalation. ... The selection of targets is interesting. They say they are firing at the same people who planned the attacks in Tehran, but it also bolsters the Syrian army effort right now." (see also Syrian Desert campaign (May–July 2017) and Siege of Deir ez-Zor (2014–17)) Amir Daftari, a CNN producer in Tehran, said that Iran hadn't hidden its support for Assad "but up until now they've led us to believe that they've provided things like military advisers, volunteers and money."

An analyst writing for The Huffington Post wrote that Iran just shifted its three decades-long policy of testing, but not using missiles, as a reaction to US President Donald Trump's escalation in the Middle East in three ways: 1) Needless increase in America's military involvement in the Syrian proxy war which signaled US intention to dominate Syria, a long-time Iran ally. Iran's missile strikes were in part to send a message: "We will not allow Syria to leave our orbit for yours." 2) Giving Saudi Arabia and other traditional US allies in the region a blank check on Middle East security, thereby emboldening them to pursue reckless policies vis-à-vis Iran demonstrated by Saudis call for taking the regional fight inside Iran, not long before terrorists attacked the parliament and Khomeini's mausoleum in Tehran – allegedly with Saudi support. "A growing number of Iranian decision-makers no longer distinguish between Saudi and American aggression, precisely because the latter has blessed the efforts of the former" hence Iran sending a message that regardless of which party attacks them they are going to attack US and its allies' spheres of control in retaliation. 3) Trump's team has called for regime change in Iran, thereby eliminating the possibility of U.S.-Iran cooperation outside the nuclear deal. Thus, Tehran's missile strikes in Syria were a clear signal to Washington: "Pursuing regime change won’t be cost-free. We may not be able to win a war, but we can survive one."

See also
2018 Iraqi Kurdistan missile strike
2018 Eastern Euphrates missile strike

References 

Conflicts in 2017
2017 Tehran attacks
June 2017 events in Iran
June 2017 events in Syria
Deir ez-Zor Governorate in the Syrian civil war
Military operations of the Syrian civil war in 2017
Military operations involving Iran
Military operations of the Syrian civil war involving Iran
Military operations of the Syrian civil war involving the Islamic State of Iraq and the Levant
Deir ez-Zor